Pawan Kumar (born 16 October 1993), also known as Pawan Saroha, is an Indian freestyle wrestler. He represented India at the 2014 Commonwealth Games in the 86 kg weight class in which he won the bronze medal. He also represented India at the 2014 Asian Games in the 86 kg weight class. His spouse is fellow wrestler Geeta Phogat.

Personal life
Kumar, also known as Pawan Saroha, married Geeta Phogat, an Olympic wrestler, on 20 November 2016.

Career

2014 Commonwealth Games 
At the 2014 Commonwealth Games, the young wrestler began his maiden CWG campaign in Glasgow, Scotland with a round of 16 matchup against Steve Hill of New Zealand, winning the match 4-0. Kumar met Luigi Bianco of Scotland in the quarter-finals and beat him 5-0. In the semi-finals, Kumar lost out to Tamerlan Tagziev of Canada with the burly Canadian beating him 5-0. There was still a chance of a medal with Kumar competing in the bronze medal match. He faced Muhammad Inam of Pakistan and ended the tightly contested match 6-6. But he was awarded the bronze medal in the particular category since he was the last one to score a point.

2014 Asian Games 
The 2014 Asian Games, held in Incheon, South Korea, wasn't as rewarding for Kumar. In the round of 16, Kumar faced off against Sumir Kumar Sah of Nepal and won 4-0. Progressing to the quarter-finals stage, Kumar was up against Mostafajoukar Meisam of Iran but lost 0-4 to the Iranian. With the latter qualifying for the finals, Kumar was given a chance to compete in the repechage round where he met Zhang Feng of China but ultimately crashed out of the tournament, losing 1-3.

References

External links
Profile at United World Wrestling

Living people
1993 births
People from Delhi
Sport wrestlers from Delhi
Commonwealth Games bronze medallists for India
Wrestlers at the 2014 Commonwealth Games
Wrestlers at the 2014 Asian Games
Indian male sport wrestlers
Commonwealth Games medallists in wrestling
Wrestlers at the 2018 Asian Games
Asian Games competitors for India
Medallists at the 2014 Commonwealth Games